Carbine Club Stakes may refer to:

 Carbine Club Stakes (ATC), an Australian Turf Club horse race
 Carbine Club Stakes (VRC), a Victoria Racing Club horse race